Secrets of Aspen is an American reality television series that aired from January 3 until February 21, 2010.

Premise
Cameras follow six single women who live in the ski resort town of Aspen, Colorado.

Production
The production company used 35 crew members while filming the show, 12 of which were local, and spent $701,000 in the city during the shooting of the series.

Episodes

Reception
Ant Mitchell of The Michigan Daily wrote "Secrets of Aspen never pretends to be anything but what it is - trash". John Griffiths of Us Weekly called the show "dishy and fast-paced fun".

In January, the show averaged 535,000 viewers while the season finale was watched by 487,000 viewers. Local residents complained about the show to Aspen City Hall and on the Facebook page ''Aspen Against VH-1's 'Secrets of Aspen'.

References

External links
 
TV Guide

2010 American television series debuts
2010 American television series endings
2010s American reality television series
English-language television shows
VH1 original programming
Television shows set in Colorado